Lourdes de Oliveira (born 17 December 1938) is a Brazilian actress. She is known for her role as Mira in the 1959 romantic tragedy Black Orpheus.

Biography 
De Oliveira was born on 17 December 1938 in Rio de Janeiro. She acted in two films, the 1959 romantic tragedy Black Orpheus and the 1960 adventure film Os Bandeirantes.

Filmography

References

External links 
 Lourdes de Oliveira on IMDB

Living people
1938 births
20th-century Brazilian actresses
Actresses from Rio de Janeiro (city)
Afro-Brazilian actresses
Brazilian film actresses